Jessica Voorsanger (born 1965) is an American artist and academic, living and working in London. She has worked on the "Mystery Train" project for the Institute of Contemporary Arts to make contemporary art more accessible to people with learning disabilities. Her work has been exhibited more than two dozen times with her husband, fellow artist Patrick Brill, best known as Bob and Roberta Smith.

Early life and education
Jessica Voorsanger was born in New York City in 1965 and grew up on the Upper West Side of Manhattan. Two of her grandparents were artists: her father's mother and her mother's father.

She first studied fine art at The Brooklyn Museum Art School in New York from 1982 to 1983 and obtained her Bachelor of Fine Arts at Rhode Island School of Design in 1987. She began graduate studies at Goldsmiths College, London in 1991 and received her Master of Arts in fine art in 1993.

She met Patrick Brill (the artist Bob and Roberta Smith) after graduating from Rhode Island School of Design. When he returned to London, she went with him and they are now married.

Artist
Voorsanger creates inter-active installations, objects, performances and events that reference pop and celebrity culture. As a child growing up in the 1970s she was enamored with popular sitcom television shows like The Brady Bunch and The Partridge Family, and, as one critic has reported, she believes her interest in the shows planted "the seeds of star adulation" that has influenced her work; and "that these cosy shows were a social glue, offering comfort to a nation traumatised by the Vietnam war and bankruptcy." Her artwork explores stardom, television shows, and fame using a wide range of media, including filmed performances, paintings and sculptures. Journalist Jessica lacks said, "Her brand of celebrity-quick art has occasionally been dismissed as lightweight, with critics overlooking or ignoring the fact that Voorsanger's guileful ability to make work that is as addictive and kitsch as Heat magazine, operates on the same plain as the world she is critiquing."

She particularly is interested in portraying celebrities that she believes have real talent, increasingly relevant with the advent of reality television. In 2008's Star Struck, performers were made up as Cher, Billy Idol, Michael Jackson, Devo, Kurt Cobain, George Harrison, Diana Ross, Morrissey, Paul Weller, David Hockney, Amy Winehouse and Siouxsie Sioux. The mixed media installation projected multiple films of the costumed karaoki performers singing the songs of another artist: David Bowie's Ziggy Stardust was sung by Amy Winehouse. The installation included portraits of the chosen celebrities.

Voorsanger was commissioned to work on an Institute of Contemporary Arts six-month project entitled "Mystery Train." She partnered in 2008 with Art on the Underground and Pursuing Independent Paths (PIP) to make transportation easier to navigate and encourage people with learning disabilities to explore contemporary art venues. PIP students and Voorsanger visited London's museums and galleries, had a behind-the-scenes tour of the Charing Cross Underground station and developed multiple communications media, including "Heads, Bodies, Legs" posters and costumed karaoke games. Each poster has a composite image the head, body and legs of ICA staff, London Underground staff and PIP students. Art educator, Emily Candela commented: "I have enjoyed the sense of exploration that runs through Mystery Train. Travel itself – and London's transport system in particular – served both as inspiration for our projects with Jessica Voorsanger as well as the link between our base at the ICA, PIP's centre in Westminster and the world of galleries and museums that we discovered."

Lecturer
Voorsanger has lectured since 1997 for Goldsmiths College Masters of Arts program, Sunderland, Camberwell College of Arts, Royal College of Art, and The Slade. From 1998 to 2003, she was a lecturer in pictorial arts at Kent Institute of Art & Design. Since 2003 she has been a part-time lecturer for both the University for the Creative Arts's Fine Art and Research and Wimbledon School of Art's Bachelor of Arts programs. Voorsanger has been an external examiner for the University of East London since 2007.

Exhibitions
She has exhibited widely in the United Kingdom, United States and Germany. She and her husband, Patrick Brill, known as the artist Bob and Roberta Smith, exhibited together more than 2 dozen times. Some of her solo and group exhibitions are:

Solo shows
 1998 – Jessica Voorsanger – Wilkinson Gallery, London, England
 2003 – I Think I Love You – Collective Gallery, Edinburgh, Scotland
 2007 – The Agony and the Ecstasy – George Rodger Gallery, Maidstone, Kent, England
 2008 – The Woody Allen Show – Gallery 33, Berlin (closed, 2008)
 2009 – Crimefighters – Kornhäuschen, Aschaffenburg, Germany
 2009 – Eastenders – Whitechapel Art Gallery, London, England
 2011 – Peckham Heroes – Peckham Space, London, England
 2013 – Jessica Voorsanger – Worldstaronestoppopshop – Kornhäuschen, Aschaffenburg

Group exhibitions
 1995 – Lost Property / Trill – W139, Amsterdam
 1996 – Michael Corris, "Gang Warfare" – Le Consortium, Dijon
 1998 – Channel 3 – team (gallery, inc.), New York City, NY
 2000 – Horten und SITE + Gäste - Kunstverein für die Rheinlande und Westfalen, Düsseldorf
 2001 – Teeth & Trousers – Cell Project Space, London, England
 2002 – Air Guitar – Cornerhouse, Manchester, England
 2002 – Air Guitar – Milton Keynes Gallery, Milton Keynes, Buckinghamshire, England
 2003 – Air Guitar  – Angel Row Gallery, Nottingham, England (closed)
 2003 – Air Guitar – Tullie House Museum, Carlisle, Cumbria, England
 2003 – Independence – SLG South London Gallery, London, England
 2004 – The Birthday Party – Collective Gallery, Edinburgh, Scotland
 2006 – Forward/Backward and Reloading – Island6 Arts Center, Shanghai
 2006 – Metropolis Rise: New Art From London – , London, England
 2007 – Art Car Boot Fair 2007 – Art Car Boot Fair, London, England
 2008 – Mapping Correspondence: Mail Art in the 21st Century – The Center for Book Arts, New York City, NY
 2008 – Starstruck – The New Art Gallery Walsall, Walsall, West Midlands, England
 2008 – The Famous, the Infamous & the Really Quite Good – Decima Gallery, London, England
 2008 – The Golden Record – Sounds of Earth – Collective Gallery, Edinburgh, Scotland
 2009 – Horn of Plenty – Viktor Wynd Fine Art, London, England
 2009 – Famous – Celebrity(ies) and Visual Art – Künstlerhaus Dortmund, Dortmund
 2009 – Reg Perfect and the Squeegees – Portman Gallery, London, England
 2009 – Too Much is Not Enough – Transition Gallery, London, England
 2009 – Warholesque – Richard Young Gallery, London, England
 2010 – Sold Out – Elastic Residence, London, England
 2010 – Stardust Boogie Woogie – Monika Bobinska (former Lounge Gallery), London, England
 2010 – The House of Fairy Tales – Exquisite Trove – Newlyn Art Gallery, Newlyn, England
 2010 – The House of Fairy Tales – Millennium, St. Ives, Cornwall, England
 2010 – Stardust Boogie Woogie – Art Laboratory Berlin, Berlin
 2010 – Unrealised Potential – Cornerhouse, Manchester, England
 2011 – Drawing 2011 – Biennial Fundraiser – The Drawing Room, London, England
 2011 – Fraternise – Beaconsfield, Beaconsfield, England
 2011 – Pulp Fictions – Transition Gallery, London, England
 2012 – Adventure – Herrick Gallery, London, England
 2012 – Plate – Herrick Gallery, London, England
 2012 – Tainted Love – Meter Room, Coventry, England
 2012 – Tainted Love – Transition Gallery, London, England
 2013 – Collage Principle – Kornhäuschen, Aschaffenburg

See also
 Anna Barriball, self-reflection poster campaign for London Underground escalators

References

Further reading

External links 
 Jessica Voorsanger's Official Website

1965 births
Living people
American people of Dutch descent
American contemporary painters
American women painters
20th-century American painters
21st-century American painters
20th-century British painters
21st-century British painters
American emigrants to England
British people of Dutch descent
20th-century American women artists
21st-century American women artists